Christopher Anthony Billy is a retired footballer who played as a midfielder. He played in the Football League for Huddersfield Town, Plymouth Argyle, Notts County, Bury and Carlisle United. He also played for Halifax Town, Farsley Celtic and Ossett Town.

Career
Billy began his career with Huddersfield Town in 1991. He scored the winning goal in the Second Division play-off Final at Wembley Stadium in 1995 that saw Huddersfield promoted to the First Division under the management of Neil Warnock. The latter resigned within days and was appointed manager of Plymouth Argyle, who had just been relegated to the Third Division, and he signed Billy in August. He scored four goals in his first season with the club as they gained promotion via the play-offs, and made 137 appearances in all competitions during his three seasons with Argyle, scoring nine times. He had a brief spell with Notts County in 1998 before being signed by Warnock again, this time for Bury. He spent five seasons with Bury and amassed 178 league appearances, with 11 goals.

He left Bury in 2003 and moved to Carlisle United, where he experienced relegation from the Football League in his first season with the club. Carlisle made a swift return from the Football Conference the following season, gaining promotion through the play-offs. Having made 142 appearances for Carlisle, Billy was transferred to Halifax Town in January 2007. Eight months later, he was released from his contract to join Farsley Celtic. He spent time on loan with Ossett Town, having signed in February 2008, before retiring as a player.

References

External links

1973 births
Living people
Footballers from Huddersfield
English footballers
Association football midfielders
Huddersfield Town A.F.C. players
Plymouth Argyle F.C. players
Notts County F.C. players
Bury F.C. players
Carlisle United F.C. players
Halifax Town A.F.C. players
Farsley Celtic A.F.C. players
Ossett Town F.C. players
English Football League players